Galuzardab (also romanized as Galūzardāb; also known as Gol Zardeh and Gol Zardū) is a village in Estabraq Rural District, in the Central District of Shahr-e Babak County, Kerman Province, Iran. At the 2006 census, its population was 185, in 33 families.

References 

Populated places in Shahr-e Babak County